Guillermo Antonio Delgado Quinteros (11 February 1931 – 1 April 2014) was a Peruvian footballer who played at both professional and international levels as a defender.

Career
Born in Ica, Delgado played in Peru, Colombia and Spain for Centro Iqueño, Huracán, Alianza Lima, Deportivo Cali, Real Zaragoza and Cádiz.

He was a member of the Peruvian national team between 1952 and 1957.

He was also manager of Cádiz in 1971.

Later life and death
He died in Cádiz, Spain on 1 April 2014, at the age of 83.

References

1931 births
2014 deaths
Peruvian footballers
Peru international footballers
Centro Iqueño footballers
Club Alianza Lima footballers
Deportivo Cali footballers
Real Zaragoza players
Cádiz CF players
Peruvian Primera División players
Categoría Primera A players
Segunda División players
Association football defenders
People from Ica, Peru
Peruvian expatriate footballers
Peruvian expatriate sportspeople in Colombia
Peruvian expatriate sportspeople in Spain
Expatriate footballers in Colombia
Expatriate footballers in Spain
Peruvian football managers
Peruvian expatriate football managers
Expatriate football managers in Spain
Cádiz CF managers
Huracán de Medellín players